Macrojoppa is a genus of Ichneumonidae wasp.

Description
They are parasites of Papilionidae and Nymphalidae

Taxonomy
Macrojoppa contains the following species:
 Macrojoppa inclyta
 Macrojoppa violacea
 Macrojoppa latipennis
 Macrojoppa pulcherrima
 Macrojoppa scutellaris
 Macrojoppa blandita
 Macrojoppa stapedifera
 Macrojoppa rufa

References

Insects described in 1898
Taxa named by Joseph Kriechbaumer
Ichneumoninae
Ichneumonidae genera